Kazbek Valeryevich Kokov  (Kabardian: КӀуэкӀуэ Валерэ и къуэ Къазбэч; , ; born July 20, 1973) is a Russian politician. He is head of Kabardino-Balkaria since October 3, 2019 (acting head of KBR since September 2018).
He is the son of the first president of Kabardino-Balkaria.

Biography 
 The son of the first President of Kabardino-Balkaria Valery Kokov

 Graduated from the Kabardino-Balkar Institute of agroforestry.

 Since 1995, he has worked as Deputy General Director for commercial and General matters of OAO "Halicky plant “nal"”.
Since 2002 – General Director of JSC "Kabbalkresursy".

 From 2003 to 2007 – the Deputy of city Council of the city of Nalchik.

 Since 2009 – member of Parliament in Kabardino-Balkaria

 Since 2010 – Deputy Minister of agriculture and food of the Kabardino-Balkaria.

 Since April 2013 – adviser to the regional management unit of the Russian President for domestic policy, was in charge of North Caucasus region.

 Since September 26, 2018 – Acting head of Kabardino-Balkaria.
Since October 3, 2019 – Head of Kabardino-Balkaria.

Family 
Married. His wife, Liana Ruslanovna, is a teacher of labor law at the state university in Nalchik. He has two daughters.

References

External links

 Официальный сайт Главы и Правительства Кабарди́но-Балка́рская Республики

1973 births
Living people
Kabardino-Balkaria
Heads of the Kabardino-Balkarian Republic
United Russia politicians
21st-century Russian politicians
Circassian people of Russia
Russian Sunni Muslims